Sturm, Ruger & Company, Inc., better known by the shortened name Ruger, is an American firearm manufacturing company based in Southport, Connecticut, with production facilities also in Newport, New Hampshire; Mayodan, North Carolina; and Prescott, Arizona. The company was founded in 1949 by Alexander McCormick Sturm and William B. Ruger, and has been publicly traded since 1969.

Ruger produces bolt-action, semi-automatic, and single-shot rifles, shotguns, semi-automatic pistols, and single- and double-action revolvers.  According to the ATF statistics for 2015, Ruger is currently America's largest firearm manufacturer, as well as the second largest pistol and revolver manufacturer (behind Smith & Wesson) and rifle manufacturer (behind Remington) in the United States.

History

Sturm, Ruger & Company was founded by William B. Ruger and Alexander McCormick Sturm in 1949 in a small rented machine shop in Southport, Connecticut.

Just prior to their partnership, Bill Ruger had successfully duplicated two Japanese "baby" Nambu pistols in his garage, from a captured Nambu that he acquired from a returning Marine, at the close of World War II. When it came to designing their first semi-auto pistol, Ruger decided to incorporate the looks of the German 9mm Luger and the American Colt Woodsman into their first commercially produced .22 caliber pistol (see Ruger Standard), which became so successful that it launched the entire company.

Ruger is a dominant manufacturer in the .22 LR rimfire rifle market in the U.S., due primarily to the sales of its Ruger 10/22 semiautomatic rifle. The 10/22 is very popular due to its reputation for being relatively inexpensive and of high quality.  As a result, a wealth of after-market accessories and parts were made available for it, which has further increased its popularity. The availability and variety of after-market parts makes it possible to build a 10/22 using only these parts; most of which are marketed to target shooters and hunters.

Ruger similarly dominates the .22 rimfire semi-automatic pistol market with the Ruger MK IV, a descendant of the Ruger Standard pistol. Like the 10/22, the Mark Series is supported with a wide variety of after-market accessories.  The 22/45 is similar to the Ruger Standard family of pistols but features a different grip angle, that of the Colt 1911 (as opposed to that of a Luger utilized in the Ruger Standard).

Ruger is also renowned for the production of high-quality revolvers, such as the GP100 and Redhawk lines. They also have some presence in the semi-auto pistol market, with the SR1911 and SR lines of handguns.

From 1949 through 2004, Ruger manufactured over 20 million firearms. The company is headquartered in Southport, Connecticut, and maintains manufacturing facilities in Newport, New Hampshire, Prescott, Arizona, and Mayodan, North Carolina. Ruger's subsidiaries are Ruger Precision Metals LLC in Earth City, Missouri, Pine Tree Castings in Newport, New Hampshire, and Ruger Sportswear & Accessories in Mayodan, North Carolina. Ruger's Pine Tree Castings division makes ferrous, ductile iron, and commercial titanium castings. Ruger had a division known as Ruger Golf, making steel and titanium castings for golf clubs made by a number of different brands.

Sturm, Ruger stock has been publicly traded since 1969 and became a New York Stock Exchange company in 1990 (NYSE:RGR). After Alex Sturm's death in 1951, William B. Ruger continued to direct the company until his death in 2002.

In September 2020, the company bought the Marlin Firearms company from bankrupt Remington Outdoor Company.

Statistics
Ruger was ranked the number one U.S. firearms manufacturer from 2008 to 2011. In 2011, Ruger manufactured 1,114,687 firearms, as their promotion, the "Million Gun Challenge to Benefit the NRA", played a significant role in the company maintaining its top U.S. manufacturer status. The company has set a new goal of 2 million firearms produced per year. From 2009 to 2012, Ruger was the top-seller of handguns.

Products
Ruger breaks down its products into nine categories:

 bolt-action rifles
 autoloading rifles
 lever-action rifles
 single-shot rifles

 shotguns

 centerfire pistols
 rimfire pistols

 double-action revolvers
 single-action revolvers

Rifles

Bolt-action rifles

Hawkeye M77
Gunsite Scout Rifle
Model 77/22
American Rifle
American Rimfire
Ruger Precision Rifle
Ruger Precision Rimfire

Autoloading rifles

Model 44 (discontinued)
10/22
10/17 (discontinued)
SR-22
Mini-14
Mini Thirty 
XGI (not produced: development halted)
Police Carbine (discontinued)
Ruger PC Carbine
Deerfield Carbine (discontinued)
AR-556
SR-556 (discontinued)
SR-762 (discontinued)

Lever-action rifles
Model 96 (96/44, 96/22 and 96/17 discontinued)

Single-shot rifles
No. 1
No. 3 (discontinued)

Shotguns

Gold Label (discontinued)
Red Label (discontinued)

Submachine guns
MP9 (discontinued)

Handguns

Centerfire pistols

Hawkeye (discontinued)
P-Series (discontinued)
SR-Series (discontinued)
American Pistol
Security-9
Ruger MAX-9
SR1911
LCP
LCP II
LCP Max
LC9
LC380
LC9s
Ruger-5.7

Rimfire pistols

Standard (MK I) (discontinued)
MK II (discontinued)
MK III / 22/45 (discontinued)
MK IV
SR22
22 Charger

Double-action revolvers

Security-Six/Service-Six/Speed-Six (discontinued)
SP101
GP100
Redhawk 
Super Redhawk
Super Redhawk Alaskan
LCR

Single-action revolvers

Bearcat
Single-Six
Blackhawk
Super Blackhawk
Vaquero
Wrangler
Old Army (discontinued)

See also 
 List of modern armament manufacturers

References

Bibliography

External links

 Official website

 
Companies listed on the New York Stock Exchange
Companies based in Fairfield County, Connecticut
Firearm manufacturers of the United States
Military in Connecticut
Manufacturing companies established in 1949